The Mayor of Latina is an elected politician who, along with the Latina's City Council, is accountable for the strategic government of Latina in Lazio, Italy. current Mayor is Damiano Coletta, a centre-left independent, who took office on 20 June 2016. The office has been held by a special commissioner from 11 July to 5 September 2022, after the annulling of election results from 2021, replacing Coletta, until a snap election re-confirmed the Mayor.

Overview
According to the Italian Constitution, the Mayor of Latina is member of the City Council.

The Mayor is elected by the population of Latina, who also elects the members of the City Council, controlling the Mayor's policy guidelines and is able to enforce his resignation by a motion of no confidence. The Mayor is entitled to appoint and release the members of his government.

Since 1993 the Mayor is elected directly by Latina's electorate: in all mayoral elections in Italy in cities with a population higher than 15,000 the voters express a direct choice for the mayor or an indirect choice voting for the party of the candidate's coalition. If no candidate receives at least 50% of votes, the top two candidates go to a second round after two weeks. The election of the City Council is based on a direct choice for the candidate with a preference vote: the candidate with the majority of the preferences is elected. The number of the seats for each party is determined proportionally.

Kingdom of Italy (1861–1946)
The city of Littoria was founded by the fascist government in 1932 and was ruled by an authoritarian Podestà chosen by the National Fascist Party. The office of Mayor of Latina was created in 1944 during the Allied occupation.

Italian Republic (since 1946)

City Council election (1946-1993)
From 1946 to 1993, the Mayor of Latina was elected by the City's Council.

Direct election (since 1993)
Since 1993, under provisions of new local administration law, the Mayor of Latina is chosen by direct election.

Notes

References

External links
 

Latina
 
People from Latina, Lazio
Politics of Lazio
Latina, Lazio